Dunaújváros FC (previously known as Dunaferr SE) was a football team from Dunaújváros, Hungary. Though they won the Hungarian NB I in 1999–2000, recently they played in the second league, until the team withdrew in March 2009, ceasing its operations.

History

Domestic
The team was founded in 1952 and one year later they were promoted to the Hungarian first division under the name Sztálinvárosi Vasmű Építők. In 1954 they were relegated to the second division and from then on they bounced back and forth between the two. From 1961 the team was known as Dunaújvárosi Kohász SE. Whilst holding this name their best finish was in 1978, 7th in the NB I.

In 1998 they entered the NB I. under the name Dunaferr SE and won their first and only Hungarian championship in 2000. In 2001 they finished 2nd behind Ferencváros . In 2003 they were relegated from the NB I. At this point they had played 20 seasons in the top division. Unfortunately the Dunaferr company ended their support of the men's football team, and in 2004 when the NB I. returned from a 12-team format to a 16-team format they were unable to return and all football operations ended.

The team was resurrected by local Hungarian businessmen József Andics and József Héger and football operations returned. With the league's permission the team began play in the NB I/B (now called NB II). In 2004 they finished 16th, in 2005 5th, and in 2006 13th. The team withdrew from the second league in March 2009, and ceased operations.

UEFA Cup

UEFA Champions League

International
Following their championship in 2000, the team qualified for the Second Qualifying Round of the UEFA Champions League 2000-01 where they defeated Hajduk Split 2–0 and 2–2. In the 3rd round they tied against Rosenborg 2–2 in Hungary, but lost in Norway 1–2, ending their only Champions League run.

Team names
Like many football clubs, the team has undergone a number of name changes. The most notable change actually came when the city changed its name from Sztálinváros (Stalin Town, or equivalent to Stalingrad) to Dunaújváros (Danubian New Town).
 1951: Dunapentelei Vasas
 1952: Sztálin Vasmű Építők
 1954: Sztálinvárosi Vasas
 1956: Dunapentelei Vasas
 1957: Dunapentelei SC
 1957: Sztálinvárosi Vasas
 1959: Sztálinvárosi Kohász Sport Egyesület
 1961: Dunaújvárosi Kohász Sport Egyesület
 1990: Dunaferr Sport Egyesület
 2003: Slant/Fint Dunaújváros
 200?: Dunaújvárosi Kohász
 200?: Dunaújváros Futball Club

Honours
Hungarian Championship: 2000

External links
 Official Website of Dunaújváros FC

Football clubs in Hungary
Association football clubs established in 1952
Defunct football clubs in Hungary
Association football clubs disestablished in 2009
1952 establishments in Hungary
2009 disestablishments in Hungary
Dunaújváros